Mackenzie "Mack" Darragh (born December 8, 1993) is a Canadian competitive swimmer. He holds the Canadian record for the 200 m butterfly.

Career

International Swimming League 
Darragh signed to the NY Breakers for the ISL's inaugural season. In spring 2020, Darragh signed for Toronto Titans in their first ISL season.

World Championships 
In 2016, Darragh was named to Canada's Olympic team for the 2016 Summer Olympics.
At the 2011 World Junior Swimming Championships in Lima, Peru, Darragh won the bronze medal in 200 m butterfly.

Other 
In September 2017, Darragh was named to Canada's 2018 Commonwealth Games team.
Darragh was awarded All-American for 200 m butterfly in 2015.

References

External links
 
 
 
 
 
 

1993 births
Living people
Canadian male butterfly swimmers
Swimmers from Mississauga
Swimmers at the 2016 Summer Olympics
Olympic swimmers of Canada
Swimmers at the 2018 Commonwealth Games
Commonwealth Games competitors for Canada
20th-century Canadian people
21st-century Canadian people